Immanuel College is a mixed Church of England secondary school and sixth form located in the City of Bradford, West Yorkshire, England. It was officially opened in October 2001.

History 
The school began when construction began in 2000 and was finally opened in 2001 by the Bishop of Bradford, David Smithmany parts of the school were still unfinished and it wasn't until 2003 that the school could be considered fully built. The school now has modern facilities such as modern computer suites in most departments, dining facilities and a large sports hall.

Previously a voluntary aided school administered by Bradford City Council, in February 2016 Immanuel College was converted to academy status. However the school continues to be under the guidance of the Diocese of Leeds, and coordinates with Bradford City Council for admissions.

Layout

School Data 
Background Information
	
Total number of pupils (all ages) 	                      1133
Number of day pupils of compulsory school age                1090
% of half days missed due to authorised absence              3.8%
% of half days missed due to unauthorised absence            37.2%
    
School Data from (Data from 2005)

References

External links 
 Immanuel College

Schools in Bradford
Educational institutions established in 2001
Secondary schools in the City of Bradford
Church of England secondary schools in the Diocese of Leeds
2001 establishments in England
Academies in the City of Bradford